Character design may refer to:

Characterisation, the process of conveying information about characters
Character creation, the process of defining a game character
Model sheet, a document used to help standardize the appearance, poses, and gestures of an animated character